Isognomostoma is a genus of air-breathing land snails, terrestrial pulmonate gastropod mollusk in the subfamily Ariantinae of the family Helicidae, the typical snails.

Species
Species within the genus Isognomostoma include:
 Isognomostoma isognomostomos (Schröter, 1784)
Synonyms
 Isognomostoma holosericum  (S. Studer, 1820): synonym of Causa holosericea (S. Studer, 1820)
 Isognomostoma isognomostoma (Schröter, 1784): synonym of Isognomostoma isognomostomos (Schröter, 1784)

References

 Groenenberg D.S.J., Subai P. & Gittenberger E. (2016). Systematics of Ariantinae (Gastropoda, Pulmonata, Helicidae), a new approach to an old problem. Contributions to Zoology. 85(1): 37-65

External links
 Fitzinger, L.J. (1833). Systematisches Verzeichniß der im Erzherzogthume Oesterreich vorkommenden Weichthiere, als Prodrom einer Fauna derselben. Beiträge zur Landeskunde Oesterreichs's unter der Enns, 3: 88-122. Wien

Helicidae
Gastropod genera